Sonya O. Rose (1935 – October 15, 2020) was an American historian, sociologist, and academic. She received her B.A. degree from Antioch College in 1958, and her M.A. and Ph.D. degrees from Northwestern University in 1962 and 1974, respectively.

Research
Rose is an expert in the role of gender identity in British history, with a particular emphasis on the role of the woman in industrial development during the 19th and 20th centuries, and domestically during World War II. She has conducted detailed research into the capitalist society, industrialization and the role of women in factories during these periods, including an insight into the age of women with children working in factories, in professions such as lace clipping in Nottinghamshire. Historian Angela Woollacott notes that according to Rose, class and gender are not separate systems or structures in 19th century industrial England, but the "content of class relations is gendered and the content of gender distinctions and gender relations is 'classed'".
Rose has also commented on the roles of civic republicanism and citizenship during World War II.

Writing
Rose's 1974 dissertation was titled, Managing uncertainty: The honeymoon period of new patients on an adolescent ward. She has authored books such as Limited Livelihoods: Gender and Class in Nineteenth-Century England (University of California Press, 1992), Gender and Class in Modern Europe (Cornell University Press, 1996), Gender, Citizenship, and Subjectivities (Blackwell Publishers, 2002) and At Home with the Empire: Metropolitan Culture and the Imperial World, (Cambridge University Press, 2006), co-edited with Catherine Hall. In 2010, Rose wrote a book on What is Gender History?, which Katie Close of the University of Glasgow describes as featuring "discussions of bodies and sexuality, gender and race/class, masculinities and the contributions of gender historians to central historical topics and themes, including wars and revolution". Other works include 'Gender at work' : Sex, class and industrial capitalism and Which people's war? : national identity and citizenship in Britain, 1939-1945 (2003).

Death
Rose died on October 15, 2020 in Sarasota, Florida, at the age of 84.

References

1935 births
2020 deaths
21st-century American historians
American sociologists
American women sociologists
Antioch College alumni
Historians of the United Kingdom
American social sciences writers
American relationships and sexuality writers
University of Michigan faculty
21st-century American women writers
American women historians